Biofar is a French laboratory specializing in food supplements in the form of effervescent tablets. It was founded in 1999 and its headquarters is in Paris, France.

The Biofar range contain many references to meet most of their customer's daily needs. The Biofar products are available in most pharmacies and parapharmacies.

References

External links 
 

Laboratories in France
1999 establishments in France
Companies based in Paris